Paruresis, also known as shy bladder syndrome, is a type of phobia in which a person is unable to urinate in the real or imaginary presence of others, such as in a public restroom. The analogous condition that affects bowel movement is called parcopresis or shy bowel.

Signs and symptoms 
Some people have brief, isolated episodes of urinary difficulty in situations where other people are in close proximity.  Paruresis, however, goes beyond simple shyness, embarrassment, fear of exposure, or fear of being judged for not being able to urinate. Other people may find that they are unable to urinate while in moving vehicles, or are fixated on the sounds of their urination in quiet restrooms or residential settings. In severe cases, a person with paruresis can urinate only when alone at home or through the process of catheterization.

Causes 
One possible cause of paruresis is undergoing a voiding cystourethrography (VCUG) in the past. "Complications that can occur in both sexes include UTI, hematuria, cystitis as well as urinary dysfunction following a catheterization, phobia of urination, nocturia, and stopping urination. In the literature, psychological trauma resulting from VCUG was considered the same as from a violent rape, especially in girls."

Pathophysiology
It appears that paruresis involves a tightening of the sphincter or bladder neck due to a sympathetic nervous system response. The adrenaline rush that produces the involuntary nervous system response probably has peripheral and central nervous system involvement. The internal urethral sphincter (smooth muscle tissue) or the external urethral sphincter (striated muscle), levator ani (especially the pubococcygeus) muscle area, or some combination of the above, may be involved. It is possible that there is an inhibition of the detrusor command through a reflex pathway as well. The pontine micturition center (Barrington's nucleus) also may be involved, as its inhibition results in relaxation of the detrusor and prevents the relaxation of the internal sphincter.

Diagnosis
The condition is catered for in the rules for mandatory urine testing for drugs in UK prisons, and UK Incapacity Benefit tribunals also recognise it.  It is listed in the NHS on-line encyclopaedia of conditions and disorders. It is now reported to have been accepted as a valid reason for jury service excusal. From 1 August 2005, the guidance on the rules relating to the testing of those on probation in the UK cites paruresis as a valid reason for inability to produce a sample which is not to be construed as a refusal.

The condition is recognised by the American Urological Association, who include it in their on-line directory of conditions.

Paruresis was described in section 300.23 of the DSM-IV-TR as "performance fears . . . using a public restroom" but it was not mentioned by name. The Diagnostic and Statistical Manual of Mental Disorders (DSM-5) mentions paruresis by name.

Kaplan & Sadock's Synopsis of Psychiatry states, "Persons with social phobias (also called social anxiety disorder) have excessive fears of humiliation or embarrassment in various social settings, such as in speaking in public, urinating in a public rest room (also called shy bladder), and speaking to a date." The Synopsis describes shy bladder as "inability to void in a public bathroom" and notes that relaxation exercises are an application of behavior therapy for dealing with this disorder. Some paruretics experience delayed urination and must wait for their need to void to overcome their anxiety, while others are unable to urinate at all.

Treatment
In terms of treating the mental aspect of paruresis, such treatment can be achieved by graduated exposure therapy and cognitive behavioral therapy. In graduated exposure therapy, the subject has a trusted person stand outside the restroom at first, and once the fear is overcome the observer is brought closer in, until step by step the phobia is vanquished. The International Paruresis Association provides a detailed discussion of this method on its website.
In addition to gradual exposure therapy, cognitive behavioral therapy is used to change a patient's mental approach to the condition, from one of a person who cannot urinate, to a person who can urinate or is not overly fearful when they can't publicly urinate.

History
The term paruresis was coined by Williams and Degenhart (1954) in their paper "Paruresis: a survey of a disorder of micturition" in the Journal of General Psychology 51:19-29. They surveyed 1,419 college students and found 14.4% had experienced paruresis, either incidentally or continuously.

Other names
Paruresis is also known by many colloquial terms, including bashful bladder, bashful kidneys, stage fright, pee-shyness, and shy bladder syndrome.

Society and culture

Drug testing

Some drug testing authorities find paruresis a nuisance, and some implement "shy bladder procedures" which pay no more than lip service to the condition, and where there is no evidence that they have conducted any real research into the matter. In the U.S. Bureau of Prisons, the Code of Federal Regulations provides that "An inmate is presumed to be unwilling if the inmate fails to provide a urine sample within the allotted time period. An inmate may rebut this presumption during the disciplinary process." Although U.S. courts have ruled that failure to treat properly diagnosed paruresis might violate prisoner's constitutional rights, the courts have also "routinely rejected suspicious or unsubstantiated attempts to invoke it in defense of failure to complete drug testing," particularly when there were no medical record or physician testimony to back up the claim of paruresis.

The International Paruresis Association stresses the importance of medical documentation of one's condition since "[t]he person who is unable to produce a urine sample is presumed guilty in the absence of any evidence." Some prisons have offered the use of a "dry cell"—i.e., a cell with no toilet facilities, but only a container for the prisoner's waste—as an accommodation to inmates who are hindered by paruresis from providing an observed urine sample.

FBOP Program Statement 6060.08 states, "Ordinarily, an inmate is expected to provide a urine sample within two hours of the request, but the Captain (or Lieutenant) may extend the time if warranted by specific situations (for example, the inmate has a documented medical or psychological problem, is dehydrated, etc.). Staff may consider supervising indirectly an inmate who claims to be willing but unable to provide a urine sample under direct visual supervision. For example, this might be accomplished by allowing the inmate to provide the sample in a secure, dry room after a thorough search has been made of both the inmate and the room." At least six state prison systems—Florida, Massachusetts, Maryland, Michigan, New York and Tennessee—have modified their drug testing regulations to provide accommodations for prisoners with paruresis.

Per the Handbook of Correctional Mental Health, "No definitive or objective test is available to confirm or refute the presence of paruresis. The absence of prior treatment or the ability to void in some social situations but not in others does not rule it out. Although modalities associated with the treatment of social phobias help some individuals, no universally effective medication or other treatment exists. Coercive interventions, such as forcing fluids while observing a person with paruresis, are ineffective and can cause serious medical complications. Alternatives to observed urine specimen collection for individuals who self-report paruresis include unobserved collections in a dry room, testing of hair specimens, sweat testing with a patch, and blood testing ('Test for Drugs of Abuse' 2002). These alternatives preclude the need for futile attempts to differentiate inmates with true paruresis from those who fabricate complaints."

Popular culture
The condition has been occasionally portrayed in popular culture, sometimes for comedic effect or parody. Examples of this include:
 In the 2005 comedy Waiting..., a nerdy character with paruresis is one of many bathroom jokes.
 In 2015, the International Paruresis Association protested a DirecTV ad starring Rob Lowe that portrayed a paruretic as goofy, wearing a fanny pack, and having his hair parted in the middle.
 In the American sitcom The Big Bang Theory the character Penny is revealed to suffer from bladder shyness.

See also
 The Sound Princess

References

External links
 International Paruresis Association
 United Kingdom Paruresis Trust (UKPT)

Urological conditions
Shyness
Anxiety disorders
Phobias